Gheorghe Vrănceanu (June 30, 1900 – April 27, 1979) was a Romanian mathematician, best known for his work in differential geometry and topology. He was titular member of the Romanian Academy and vice-president of the International Mathematical Union.

Biography
He was born in 1900 in Valea Hogei, then a village in Vaslui County, now a component of Lipova commune, in Bacău County. He was the eldest of five children in his family. After attending primary school in his village and high school in Vaslui, he went to study mathematics at the University of Iași in 1919. After graduating in 1922, he went in 1923 to the University of Göttingen, where he studied under David Hilbert. Thereafter, he went to the University of Rome, where he studied under Tullio Levi-Civita, obtaining his doctorate on November 5, 1924, with thesis Sopra una teorema di Weierstrass e le sue applicazioni alla stabilita. The thesis defense committee was composed of 11 faculty, and was headed by Vito Volterra.

Vrănceanu returned to Iași, where he was appointed a lecturer at the university. In 1927–1928, he was awarded a Rockefeller Foundation scholarship to study in France and the United States, where he was in a contact with Élie Cartan and Oswald Veblen. In 1929, he returned to Romania, and was appointed professor at the University of Cernăuți. In 1939, he moved to the University of Bucharest, where he was appointed Head of the Geometry and Topology department in 1948, a position he held until his retirement in 1970.

Vrănceanu was elected to the Romanian Academy as a corresponding member in 1946, then as a full member in 1955. From 1964 he was president of the Mathematics Section of the Romanian Academy.  Also from 1964, he was an editor of the journal Revue Roumaine de mathématiques pures et appliquées, founded that year. At the International Congress of Mathematicians held in Vancouver, Canada in 1974, he was elected vice-president of the International Mathematical Union, a position he held from 1975 to 1978. He died in Bucharest in 1979 of an intestinal obstruction and was buried at the city's Bellu Cemetery.

A high school in Bacău (Colegiul Național "Gheorghe Vrânceanu") is named after him, and so is a school in Lipova.

Research
During his career, Vrănceanu published over 300 articles in journals throughout the world. His work covers a whole range of modern geometry, from the classical theory of surfaces, to the notion of non-holonomic spaces, which he discovered.

In 1928 he gave an invited talk at the International Congress of Mathematicians in Bologna, titled Parallelisme et courbure dans une variété non holonome.   In it, he introduced the notion of "non-holonomic manifolds," which are smooth manifolds provided with a smooth distribution that is generally not integrable.

Publications

Notes

References 
 

1900 births
1979 deaths
People from Bacău County
Alexandru Ioan Cuza University alumni
Sapienza University of Rome alumni
20th-century Romanian mathematicians
Topologists
Differential geometers
Academic staff of Chernivtsi University
Academic staff of the University of Bucharest
Titular members of the Romanian Academy
Members of the Romanian Academy of Sciences
Romanian expatriates in Italy
Romanian expatriates in the United States
Romanian expatriates in Germany
Burials at Bellu Cemetery
Deaths from bowel obstruction